Ladaai is a 1989 Indian Hindi-language action film directed by Deepak Shivdasani,starring Mithun Chakraborty, Rekha, Dimple Kapadia, Mandakini, Gulshan Grover, Anupam Kher and Rohini Hattangadi in lead roles. The film was released on 3 November 1989 under the banner of Yashish Enterprises.

Plot

Cast
 Mithun Chakraborty as Dindayal Sharma/ Shera D. Sharma (Dual role)
 Aditya Pancholi as Amar D. Sharma 
 Rekha as Public Prosecutor Shakuntala Verma
 Dimple Kapadia as Billoo
 Mandakini as Geeta Verma
 Gulshan Grover as Peter
 Satish Shah as Radheyshyam Pundit
 Anupam Kher as Dinanath/ D. D. N./ Deendayal Sharma
 Archana Puran Singh as Shashi Verma
 Rohini Hattangadi as Shanti D. Sharma
 Deep Dhillon as Robert
 Amrit Pal as Nissar Khan
 Renu Joshi as Durga Devi
 Raj Tilak as Sunder Das

Music

References

External links
 

1989 films
1980s Hindi-language films
Indian action drama films
Films scored by Anu Malik
1980s masala films
1980s action drama films
Films directed by Deepak Shivdasani